2010 Regional League Division 2 Southern Region is the 2nd season of the League competition since its establishment in 2009. It is in the third tier of the Thai football league system.
The league has been expanded from 8 clubs in 2009 to 14 clubs this season. The league winners and runners up will qualify for the 2010 Regional League Division 2 championship stage.

Changes from last season

Team changes

Promoted clubs
Narathiwat were promoted to the 2010 Thai Division 1 League after coming 3rd in the 2009 Regional League Division 2 championship pool.

Relegated clubs
Surat Thani were relegated from the 2009 Thai Division 1 League after finishing the season in 14th place.

Relocated clubs
Prachuap Khiri Khan re-located from the Regional League Central-East Division 2009 into the Southern Division.

Expansion clubs
Trang, Ranong, Phang Nga, Chumphon and Hat Yai joined the newly expanded league setup.

Withdrawn clubs
Prachuap Khiri Khan pulled out citing insufficient budget and concerns about safety before the season commenced. They had just been relocated from the Regional League Central-East Division.

Teams

Stadia and locations

League table

Results

References

External links
 Football Association of Thailand

Regional League South Division seasons
Sou